

Ship 
Cheradi (Y 402) is a Ferry-boat of the Italian Navy in service in Taranto Naval Base area

References 

1992 ships
Auxiliary ships of the Italian Navy
Ships built in Italy
Ferries of Italy